The Tainan Film Center is a movie theater in West Central District, Tainan, Taiwan. The center is operated by the College of Sound and Image Arts of Tainan National University of the Arts.

History
The building was originally constructed in 1932 as the Old Tainan Broadcasting Station as the southernmost radio station of Taiwan Hōsō Kyōkai during the Japanese rule of Taiwan. In 2001, the building was designated as historical monument by the Tainan City Government and converted into the Tainan Film Center in 2012.

Events
The center regularly holds various cinema-related events such as film screenings, film exhibitions, conducting film-making courses and media literacy, film preservation promotions etc.

See also
 Cinema of Taiwan

References

External links

  

2002 establishments in Taiwan
Buildings and structures completed in 1932
Buildings and structures in Tainan
Event venues established in 2012
Tainan National University of the Arts
Cinemas in Taiwan
Tourist attractions in Tainan